The Hartford Americans was an American soccer club based in Hartford, Connecticut that was member of the professional American Soccer League. They joined the league in 1927, but were dropped early in the season to balance the league after the Philadelphia Celtic was suspended after only 10 games.

Year-by-year

References

Americans
Defunct soccer clubs in Connecticut
American Soccer League (1921–1933) teams